Gloriana Ranocchini (1957 – 1993) was Captain Regent of San Marino from 1 April 1984 to 1 October 1984 and 1 October 1989 to 1 April 1990.

Career 

In 1984, she was co-regent with Giorgio Crescentini.  In 1989, Leo Achilli was her co-regent. She was a member of the Sammarinese Communist Party and of the Sammarinese Women Union, a civil association for women's rights. She also founded the Sammarinese Oncological Association. She is remembered as one of the most prominent female figures of San Marino and the protagonist of the reform of Sammarinese family law.

Personal life 

She died of cancer on 8 April 1993.

References

1957 births
1993 deaths
20th-century women politicians
Captains Regent of San Marino
Members of the Grand and General Council
Female heads of state
Sammarinese women in politics
Female heads of government
Sammarinese Communist Party politicians